Silvera is a surname. Notable people with the surname include:

Adam Silvera (born 1990), American author
Al Silvera (1935–2002), American Major League Baseball player
Allan Silvera (born 1895, date of death unknown), Jamaican cricketer
Ana Silvera, English singer-songwriter, instrumentalist, and composer
Andrés Silvera (born 1977), Argentine football striker
C. Silvera (1935–2016), Indian doctor and politician
Carmen Silvera (1922–2002), British comic actress
César Fernando Silvera Fontela (born 1971), Uruguayan former football player
Charlie Silvera (1924–2019), American Major League Baseball player and coach
Damian Silvera (1974–2010), American soccer player
Darrell Silvera (1900–1993), American set decorator
Facundo Silvera (born 1997), Uruguayan football player
Facundo Silvera (born 2001), Uruguayan football player
Federica Silvera (born 1993), Uruguayan football player and futsal player
Frank Silvera (1914-1970), Jamaican-born American character actor and theatrical director
Joey Silvera (born 1951), American director and pornographic actor
Laurie Silvera (born 1939), Canadian thoroughbred racehorse trainer
Makeda Silvera (born 1955), Jamaican-Canadian novelist and short story writer
Roberto Silvera (born 1971), Uruguayan football referee
Samuel Silvera (born 2000), Australian professional football player
Simoncito Silvera (born 1982), Venezuelan former track and field athlete
Yari Silvera (born 1976), Uruguayan former football player